Nikolayevka is a rural locality (a selo) in Rabochy posyolok Novobureysky of Bureysky District, Amur Oblast, Russia. The population was 808 as of 2018. There are 11 streets.

Geography 
Nikolayevka is located 4 km east of Novobureysky (the district's administrative centre) by road. Novobureysky is the nearest rural locality.

References 

Rural localities in Bureysky District